Budućnost sada (The Future Now) is the debut album by the Serbian alternative rock band Supernaut, released by Zvono Records in 1993. The cover for the album, available only on compact cassette, was designed by Srđan Marković "Đile". After the album release, the band got the epithet "the most non-commercial band in Belgrade". In 2009, the band bassist Saša Radić announced that the band was looking for the original tapes of the band first releases, including Budućnost sada, in order to rerelease them on CD.

Track listing 
Produced, composed & arranged by Supernaut.

Personnel
 Srđan Marković "Đile" (vocals)
 Miodrag Stojanović "Čeza" (rhythm machine, keyboards)

References

External links
 EX YU ROCK enciklopedija 1960-2006, Janjatović Petar; 
 Budućnost sada at Discogs
 Budućnost sada at Rateyourmusic

Supernaut (Serbian band) albums
1993 albums
Serbian-language albums